The Bihar School Examination Board (abbreviated BSEB) is a statutory body under section 3 of Bihar School Examination  Act - 1952 which is functioning under Government of Bihar devised to conduct examinations at secondary and senior secondary standard in both government and private schools belonging to state of Bihar.

The exam is conducted on the basis of syllabus as prescribed by the Government of Bihar. It is headquartered at the capital of the state, Patna. Along with school examinations, it also conducts departmental examinations such as Diploma in Physical Education, Certificate in Physical Education and Teachers Eligibility Test (TET) for Bihar state, Simultala Residential Entrance Examinations (for admission to Simultala Awasiya Vidyalaya), Examination for Diploma in Elementary Education etc.

The board conducts secondary and senior secondary school examinations twice a year. One is the annual board examinations in February–March and the other is a supplementary examination held in May–June of every year.

Bihar Board 10th subjects 
As per syllabus, math, science, social science, two language subjects are the compulsory subjects for Class 10 students. Apart from this, they can choose one optional subject which can be a language subject or an elective subject.

Bihar Board 12th subjects 
There are three streams in Class 12 i.e. arts, commerce and science stream. For arts, there are a lot of subjects available from which 5 subjects a student need to choose. Commerce stream students need to appear for English, Hindi, Statistical mathematics, Business studies and Accountancy subjects. Science stream students have Physics, Chemistry, Biology and Mathematics as main subjects and two are elective which are also compulsory.

Along with these subjects, students have option to choose one additional subject while filling application form.

Bihar Board Exam Pattern 
The pattern for both matriculation and intermediate exams is decided by the Bihar School Examination Board.  In the examination, each paper will consist of 50% objective type questions carrying 1 mark each.  OMR sheets for 1 mark MCQs are also provided to the students.  The paper will also consist of descriptive type questions.  In addition, there are subjects which have a provision for practicals, with a weightage of 30 practicals + 70 written.

See also
 Education in Bihar

References

External links
 

Education in Bihar
School examinations in India
State secondary education boards of India
1952 establishments in Bihar
Government agencies established in 1952